Bhurkura is a village in Jakhanian tehsil of Ghazipur district. of Uttar Pradesh, India. It belongs to Varanasi Division.

 Nearest cities:Ghazipur, Chandauli, Mughalsarai
 Coordinates:   25°45'50"N   83°20'54"E
 PIN Code : 275203
 postal head office : Jakhania .

Geography
It is located 35 km towards the west from district headquarters Ghazipur. 4 km from Jakhania Gobind. 313 km from State capital Lucknow.

Parspur (2 km), Kudila (2 km), Amabansi (2 km), Husanpur (1 km), Chak Fatima Urf Bairak (3 km), Hathiya Ram (3 km) are the nearby villages to Bhurkura. Bhurkura is surrounded by Sadat Tehsil towards the south, Manihari Tehsil towards the south, Tarwa Tehsil towards the west, Virno Tehsil towards the east.

Saidpur, Ghazipur, Adari, and Azamgarh are the nearby cities to Bhurkura.	

Sarnath (Mrigadava), Varanasi (Benares), Jaunpur, Vindhyachal, and Sasaram are the nearby important tourist destinations to see.

This Place is in the border of the Ghazipur District and Azamgarh District. Azamgarh District Jahanaganj is north towards this place .

Also it is in the border of other district Mau.

Demographics
Bhojpuri is the local language. People also speak Hindi and Urdu.

Climate 
It is hot in the summer. Bhurkuda summer highest day temperature is in between 24 °C to 44 °C.

Average temperatures of January is 14 °C, February is 18 °C, March is 25 °C, April is 31 °C, May is 34 °C.

Transport

Rail

Spirituality 

The Ghazipur was the main centre for its philosophical glory. This place was get benefited by Maharshi Zamadagni ( Zamania), Maharishi Chawan (Chanani), Deval Rishi (Deval), Markandey Rishi (Near Aurihar), Bhagwan Shuka (Near Ghazipur), Bhagwan Parsuram (Harpur), etc. This place was blessed by Lord Buddha by his sermon. among them saints of Bhurkuda and their mathas are most famous in Ghazipur district and spiritually inclined people must visit here and feel the inner peace blessed by saints.

Saints of Bhurkuda
Bawari Sahiba, Bula Sahab, Bhikha Sahab and Palu Saheb & their disciples have been the source of Saint tradition. They have been of nirgun sect of satnami tradition. At Bhurkuda there are two Mathas- Bhurkura & Hathiyaram these have been the seat of Saint tradition.
Hathiyaram math isn't a follower of nirgun sect. Several statues of Hindu gods and goddesses are established there.

References 

Villages in Ghazipur district